"Shoo Be Doo" is the second single from Macy Gray's fourth studio album, Big (2007). The song became the number-one most added track at urban AC radio in late March 2007. It peaked at number fifty-five on the US Billboard Hot R&B/Hip-Hop Songs and number eleven on the Hot Adult R&B Airplay chart.

Charts

References

2007 singles
Macy Gray songs
Song recordings produced by Ron Fair
Songs written by Justin Meldal-Johnsen
Songs written by Macy Gray
2007 songs
Geffen Records singles